Robert Huish (1777 – April 1850) was a prolific English author of history books, novels, and miscellaneous other works.

Life

The son of Mark Huish of Nottingham, he was born there in 1777. He wrote a short treatise on bee-culture, which was afterwards expanded and issued in various forms. His other works are nearly all poor examples of anecdotal, quasi-historical bookmaking; the Quarterly Review spoke of him as an obscure and unscrupulous scribbler. He was prolific, as witnessed by his voluminous compilations during 1835–6. He executed a few translations from the German, and in his later years some novels. Nearly all his books exhibit anti-Tory prejudices. He died in Camberwell in April 1850.

Works
His works comprise:
 A Treatise on the Nature, Economy, and Practical Management of Bees, London, 1815.
 Memoirs of her late Royal Highness Princess Charlotte Augusta, 1818, with a separately issued supplement, 1818.
 The Public and Private Life of George III, 1821.
 An Authentic History of the Coronation of George IV, 1821.
 Memoirs of Caroline, Queen of Great Britain, 1821, 2 vols.
 Authentic Memoir of … Frederick, Duke of York and Albany, 1827.
 Memoirs of George IV, London, 1830, 2 vols.
 The Historical Galleries of Celebrated Men (authentic portraits), 1830; only one volume published.
 The Wonders of the Animal Kingdom, London, 1830.
 The Last Voyage of Captain Sir John Ross … to the Arctic Regions in 1829–33, London, 1835.
 The Travels of Richard and John Lander … into the interior of Africa, 1835 (with a résumé of previous African travel).
 A Narrative of the Voyages of … Captain Beechey to the Pacific and Behring's Straits, London, 1836.
 The History of the Private and Political Life of Henry Hunt, Esq., his Times and Co-temporaries, 1836.
 Memoirs of William Cobbett, Esq., 1836, 2 vols.
 The Memoirs, Private and Political, of Daniel O'Connell, 1836.
 The History of the Life and Reign of William IV, the Reform Monarch of England, 1837.
 The Natural History and General Management of Bees, 1844.
 The Progress of Crime; or, Authentic Memoirs of Marie Manning, 1849.

References

Attribution

External links
 
 

English writers
1777 births
1850 deaths